The Sun Cats are a Swedish rock & roll band founded in 1979 in response to the death of Elvis. Originally they played 1950s cover songs before writing their own music in the 1980s, their most famous song being Jailhouse Rockabilly. Their sound is comparable to contemporary American cowpunk and rockabilly bands The Blasters and the Stray Cats.

Lineup 
Chris Dahlback - Vocals and guitar
Lauri Valkonen - Slap bass
Jarno Tiihonen - Guitar
Thomas Ryden - Drums

Discography

45s
"Tear It Up - Long Black Cadillac" - 1982
"Lonesome Train - Blue Feelings" - 1983
"Rockabilly Boogie - Let It Swing" - 1985
"Last Generation - Resting In the Corner" - 1985
"That's All Right, Mama - Hound Dog" - 1992

LPs
"Jailhouse Rockabilly" - 1987
"Rockabilly Party" - 1991

CDs
"Good Rockin' Tonight" - 1993
"The Worrying Kind" - 2004

References 

Rockabilly music groups
Cowpunk musical groups
Swedish rock music groups